Leominster railway station lies on the Welsh Marches Line serving the Herefordshire town of Leominster in England.

Leominster has 2 operational platforms for north (Ludlow) and south (Hereford) bound trains respectively, though in the past it had three more to the east of the ones now in use.

History
Developed jointly by the Great Western Railway and the LNWR, it was originally a through station on their joint Shrewsbury and Hereford Railway. The GWR then took over two independently financed and developed branch lines, creating a busy junction station:
Leominster and Kington Railway to Kington and Presteigne (Platforms 3/4)
Worcester, Bromyard and Leominster Railway to Worcester (Platforms 4/5)
Both branches were however closed to passenger traffic by British Railways in the 1950s – services to Worcester ended in 1952 and to Kington in 1955.

Facilities
The station has a ticket office on platform 1, that is staffed on a part-time basis on weekdays only (06:55 – 13:25).  There is a self-service ticket machine provided for use outside of these times and for collecting pre-paid tickets.  Platform 2 has a shelter only, whilst there are customer help points, digital information displays and automatic announcements provided to offer train running details on both sides.  Though the footbridge linking the platforms has stairs, level access is provided to each platform.

Service today
Leominster now sees a regular service to important cities. The Monday-Saturday off-peak service is:

1 train per hour (tph) to Manchester Piccadilly, calling at Ludlow, Shrewsbury, Crewe, Wilmslow and Stockport.
1 tph to Carmarthen, calling at Hereford, Abergavenny, Cwmbran, Newport, Cardiff Central, Bridgend, Port Talbot Parkway, Neath, Swansea, Llanelli and Pembrey and Burry Port.
This journey is extended to Milford Haven every two hours, calling at Whitland, Clunderwen (request stop), Clarbeston Road (request stop), Haverfordwest and Johnston (request stop).

On Sundays there is also an hourly service each way, though trains do not start running until mid-morning.

References

Further reading

External links

Buildings and structures in Leominster
Railway stations in Herefordshire
DfT Category E stations
Former Shrewsbury and Hereford Railway stations
Railway stations in Great Britain opened in 1853
Railway stations served by Transport for Wales Rail